The Istanbul Rams (between 2004 and 2021 Koç Rams) are an American football team in Istanbul, Turkey, which played only 2022 in the European League of Football (ELF).

History 
The Rams belong to the Koç University Sports Club located on the campus of Koç University in Sarıyer, Istanbul. The team was founded in 2004.

After promoting to the Turkish Superleague in 2013, the Rams have since made the Turkish Superleague Final game in 2014, 2015 and 2016. In 2016, they won their first Superleague Championship, defeating the Boğaziçi Sultans, 21–14. In addition, 2016 was their first year to compete in the IFAF Europe Champions League (a minor European competition held in 2014, 2015 and 2016). The Rams became the first Turkish team to ever win a Champions League game by knocking off the St. Petersburg Griffins of Russia. Then they went on to defeat the reigning champions the Carlstad Crusaders in Sweden, to become the first Turkish team to accomplish a Final Four Champions League berth. On the 21st of July that year, they participated in IFAF Champions League 2016 Final Four at Wrocław, Poland. They faced the Milano Seamen and lost 17–14 in the last second.

On October 15, 2021, the Istanbul Rams were announced as new franchise of the European League of Football and played the 2022 season. After that season they returned to the Turkish League.

Stadium 
The Rams played and practised at the Koç University. In ELF they will be playing their home games at Maltepe Hasan Polat Stadium in Maltepe, Istanbul.

Honours 
 Turkish American Football League
 Champions: (4) 2016, 2017, 2018, 2019
 Runners-up: (2) 2014, 2015
 Central European Football League
 Champions: (0) 
 Runners-up: (1) 2018

References

External links
 Official website
 Istanbul Rams at the European League of Football official website

 
2004 establishments in Turkey
American football teams established in 2004
Sport in Sarıyer
Türkiye Korumalı Futbol Ligi teams
American football teams in Istanbul
European League of Football teams